Henry Charles "Hank" Kashiwa (born May 26, 1949) is an American former World Cup alpine ski racer who competed in the 1972 Winter Olympics.

Kashiwa learned to ski on McCauley Mountain in his hometown of Old Forge, New York. He raced for the University of Colorado and was then a member of the U.S. Army ski team for two years. From 1967 to 1972, he was on the U.S. Ski Team, and won a national title in 1969. He was an alternate on the U.S. team at the 1968 Winter Olympics at Grenoble, France. Kashiwa skied the World Cup circuit from 1968 to 1971, where he posted six top ten finishes.

After racing for the U.S. Olympic team in 1972 at Sapporo in downhill and giant slalom, Kashiwa joined the pro circuit, and starred from 1972 to 1981, winning the World Pro Title in 1975.

After retiring from competitions Kashiwa had a long career as a ski commentator on TV. He also became the President of Volant skis, a Colorado ski manufacturer. After that he served as vice-president of marketing for the Yellowstone Club, near Big Sky, Montana.

World Cup results

Season standings

Points were only awarded for top ten finishes (see scoring system).

Top ten finishes
0 podiums; 6 top tens (1 DH, 1 GS, 4 SL)

World championship results 

From 1948 through 1980, the Winter Olympics were also the World Championships for alpine skiing.

Olympic results

References

External links

Hank Kashiwa World Cup standings at the International Ski Federation
Colorado Sports Hall of Fame – Hank Kashiwa

1949 births
Living people
American male alpine skiers
Olympic alpine skiers of the United States
Alpine skiers at the 1972 Winter Olympics
Olympic Games broadcasters
Skiing announcers